The Bornes Massif (French: Massif des Bornes) is a mountainous massif in the north French Prealps in the département of Haute-Savoie. It has 20 peaks higher than 2000 m and is a popular destination for winter sports. The Massif is the source of the celebrated cheese Reblochon.

Geography

Location 

The massif is bounded on the east by the Thônes depression and the Aravis Range, where the highest peaks of the Northern Prealps are to be found, to the south-west by Lake Annecy and the Bauges Massif, and to the north by the valley of Arve and Chablais. The name "Aravis Massif" is also used to refer to the whole massif, possibly an effect of tourist marketing.

The massif can be accessed though numerous open valleys which separate the massif's peaks:
 From Annecy via the Bluffy col (631 m) or via the recently widened Dingy-Saint-Clair pass, both of which lead to Thônes,
 From Bonneville via the Borne gorge which leads to Saint-Jean-de-Sixt,
 From the east (Megève) via the Aravis col (1486 m, with a view of Mont Blanc) which leads to La Clusaz,
 From Cluses to the north-east via the col de la Colombière, closed in winter, which leads to Le Grand-Bornand,
 From the south (Faverges, Ugine) via the Marais col (843 m) which leads to Thônes.
Two important rivers traverse the massif:
 The Fier from Mont Charvin in the Aravis at Annecy passing by Thônes, the crossroads of the valleys,
 The Borne de la Pointe-Percée at Bonneville which flows into the Arve, passing by le Grand-Bornand and le Petit-Bornand.

Summits 

Main summits of the massif, outside those from the Aravis range:
 Pointe Blanche, 2438m, highest point in the Massif, part of the Bargy range
 Pic de Jallouvre, 2408m part of the Bargy range
 Pointe du midi, 2364m Bargy range
 La Tournette, 2351m good view from Annecy lake
 Grand Bargy, 2301m
 Pointe de Balafrasse, 2296m
 Pointe Dzérat (or pointe Est du Midi), 2278m
 Pointe d'Almet, 2232m
 Pointe de la Grande Combe, 2210m
 Petit Bargy, 2098m
 le Buclon, 2072m
 la Cime de Février, 2056m
 Mount Lachat de Châtillon, 2050m (below le Grand-Bornand)
 l'Aiguille verte, 2045m
 Pointe de la Beccaz, 2041m
 le Crêt des Mouches, 2033m
 Mont Lachat, 2023m (north Thônes)
 Pointe de Deux Heures, 2018m
 Pointe de Banc Fleuri, 2009m
 la Montagne de Sous-Dine, 2004m
 Pointe d'Andey, 1877m
 Mont Veyrier, 1291m

Summits visible from Annecy (and the massif de la Tournette):
 Tête du Parmelan, 1832m
 Dents de Lanfon, 1824m
 Mount Veyrier, 1291m
 Mount Baron, 1254m (in the Veyrier mountains)

As well as its peaks, it has plateaus which are slightly elevated but difficult to access, such as the plateau des Glières tragically famous from the time of the Second World War.

Geology 
As with all the prealpine massifs, the Aravis chain is primarily formed of limestone and its derivatives.

Activities

Tourist station 
The massif benefits from exceptional snow considering its moderate altitude. It hosts two stations for the winter sports Alpine skiing and cross-country skiing, with pistes from 900m up to 2000m:
 Le Grand-Bornand (Chinaillon)
 Le Mont-Saxonnex (pronounced "saxxonay")
 Saint-Jean-de-Sixt

Tourist activities are also very popular in summer. The stations are first and foremost mountain villages where there remains significant farming activity.

The Glières Plateau is likewise a well-known site for cross-country skiing.

Economy 
The massif is the source of reblochon, the famous cheese. Reblochon was first made in Le Grand-Bornand, and is now produced in large quantities using traditional methods in the massif's valleys. Two important markets are held weekly at Thônes and at Le Grand-Bornand.
There is also a notable wood industry.

See also
 Geography of the Alps

External links
  Geology of the Bornes Massif
  Mount Saxonnex
  The ancient glaciers of the Bornes Massif
 Bornes Massif on Google map

Mountains of Savoie
Mountains of Haute-Savoie
Mountain ranges of Auvergne-Rhône-Alpes